Montevallo Township is a township in Vernon County, in the U.S. state of Missouri.

Montevallo Township was erected in 1855, taking its name from the community of Montevallo, Missouri.

References

Townships in Missouri
Townships in Vernon County, Missouri